Fauve Hautot (born 3 March 1986) is a French dancer and choreographer.

Early life
Fauve Hautot was born in Dieppe. Her father was an accountant with a passion for dance, and her mother was a dance teacher. She has a younger sister, Calliope, and an older brother, Ashley. She grew up in the village of Saint-Vaast-Dieppedalle (Seine-Maritime). Her name means "wildcat" or "big cat" in French. Her parents chose the name Fauve "after seeing the series Mistral's Daughter, in which a heroine is named Fauve".

As the age of 5, she began dancing Latin dances with her brother.

Career
In 2001, she was crowned junior French champion for Latin dances, runner-up in standards, and 3rd in 10 dances with Nicolas Pouget. Her 2006 victory of the TV show "Dancing Show" (which airs on France 2), alongside Maxime Dereymez (another professional dancer on Danse avec les Stars), brought her into the public eye.

Danse avec les stars 
From 2011, Fauve Hautot joined the team of professional dancers of the TV show Danse avec les stars . Her partners have included:
 The humorist Jean-Marie Bigard (Season 1, Spring 2011), with whom she finished fifth,
 The model Baptiste Giabiconi (Season 2, Fall 2011), with whom she finished third in the final
 The singer Emmanuel Moire (Season 3, Fall 2012), with whom she won the competition in the final,
 The model Baptiste Giabiconi (Danse avec les stars Christmas Party (2012), Christmas 2012), with whom she finished sixth,
 The singer Emmanuel Moire (Danse avec les stars Christmas Party (2012), Christmas 2012), with whom she finished fifth,
 The singer Keen'V (Season 4, autumn 2013), with whom she finished fourth in the semi-finals,
 The actor Miguel Ángel Muñoz (Season 5, autumn 2014), with whom she finished fourth in the semi-finals.
 The actor Rayane Bensetti (Season 5, autumn 2014) during the test of partner change
The model Terence Telle (Season 9, fall 2018), with whom she finishes third in the semifinals,
The swimmer Sami El Gueddari (Season 10, fall 2019), with whom she wins the competition in the final,
The singer Tayc (Season 11, fall 2021), with whom she wins the competition in the final.
The Filipino entertainer Billy Crawford (Season 12, fall 2022), with whom she won the competition in the final.

From October 2015, she will be part of the jury of the sixth season of the show. She will, however, continue to dance in group benefits with other professional dancers from the show.

References

Living people
1986 births
French ballroom dancers
French female dancers
French choreographers
Modern dance
People from Dieppe, Seine-Maritime
21st-century French dancers
21st-century French women